Manizer is a Russian surname of German origin.

  (1847–1925), Russian painter
 Genrikh Genrikhovich Manizer (1889–1917), Russian ethnographer
 Matvey Manizer (1891–1966), Russian sculptor
  (1890–1971), Russian sculptor
  (1927-2016), Russian painter

Surnames
Russian-language surnames